Henry Lawson Murphy (12 December 1882 – 5 January 1942) was an Irish field hockey player. He played for, amongst others, Three Rock Rovers and Ireland. Together with fellow Rovers players, Richard Gregg and Charles Power, he was a member of the Ireland team that won the silver medal at the 1908 London Olympics. Murphy played in both the 3–1 win against Wales on 29 October and in the 8–1 defeat against England in the final on 31 October. The Ireland team was part of the Great Britain Olympic team.

References

External links
 

1882 births
1942 deaths
Members of the Ireland hockey team at the 1908 Summer Olympics
Irish male field hockey players
Medalists at the 1908 Summer Olympics
Olympic silver medallists for Great Britain
Three Rock Rovers Hockey Club players
Ireland international men's field hockey players
Dublin University Hockey Club players